Karina Kasenova (born 5 June 1998) is a Russian professional racing cyclist, who last rode for the UCI Women's Team  during the 2019 women's road cycling season.

References

External links

1998 births
Living people
Russian female cyclists
Place of birth missing (living people)